Brenda Starr, Reporter (1945) was the 25th film serial released by Columbia Pictures. It was inspired by Brenda Starr, Reporter, a popular comic strip created by Dale Messick. The title role was played by Joan Woodbury, who had similar roles in feature films for Columbia and Monogram.

Plot
Daily Flash newspaper journalist Brenda Starr (Joan Woodbury), and her photographer, Chuck Allen (Syd Saylor), are assigned to cover a fire in an old house, where they discover the wounded Joe Heller (Wheeler Oakman), a mobster suspected of stealing a quarter-million-dollar payroll. The dying Heller tells Brenda that someone took his satchel of stolen money and he gives her a coded message. Kruger (Jack Ingram), the gangster who shot Heller, escapes to his gang's hideout with the bag, but discovers it is filled with paper rather than money. The gang, knowing Heller gave Brenda a coded message, makes many attempts on her life to get her to reveal where Heller hid the payroll money, but thanks to Chuck and Police Lieutenant Larry Farrel (Kane Richmond), she evades them, until Pesky (William 'Billy' Benedict), a Daily Flash office boy, succeeds in decoding the Heller message.

Cast
 Joan Woodbury as Brenda Starr
 Kane Richmond as Lt. Lawrence Farrell

Production
In September 1944 Katzman signed a deal to make the film.

Joan Woodbury later recalled:
It was made during the war and everybody was hungry, including me. My former husband had gone off to war. I was left with a little daughter. So you grabbed anything you could grab and, believe me, you were very grateful for anything that came along. This was a 13 episode thing, in 21 days! The only reason they gave me the role was the fact I could learn dialogue fast enough to do everything in one take. The most memorable thing is, on the last night, the back of the set was one solid bar and there wasn’t an inch of space between one bottle and the next. Everybody was waiting for the wrap-up, so we could have a party! But I had 19 pages of dialogue on a telephone, with nobody talking back to me. It’s great if an actor talks back, you can at least ad lib on his ad libs. When you have nobody talking back, you’ve got nobody to ad lib you. So I’d look at a page and say, ‘Okay, let’s do it,’ pick up the phone and we’d shoot it. I shot all 19 sequences in one take, because they were going to kill me if I didn’t, with all that booze waiting; and I proceeded to get bombed after that. (Laughs) Sam, at least, realized it was cheaper to hire a stuntlady than break my leg. So I didn’t fall out of windows…I didn’t have any fun at all. (Laughs) I didn’t care to do any more serials.

Release

Theatrical
The serial's theatrical release date was 26 January 1945.

Home media
Brenda Starr, Reporter is one of the last sound serials to be made available commercially. For many years, the serial was considered lost, with only a single known print in the hands of a private collector.  The serial was released on DVD by VCI Entertainment in March 2011.

Critical reception
Cline writes that Woodbury "managed to carry the story from one episode to another in fine style, leaving herself in jeopardy just enough to require [Richmond's] services as a rescuer each week... [she] salvaged by her beauty and charm what might have been Katzman's greatest fiasco except for Who's Guilty?"

The website filesofjerryblake.com writes about the film:
Brenda Starr, Reporter spent over sixty years as a “lost” serial, not receiving a post-1945 public screening until it was shown at the fan event “Serial Fest” in 2006–and not coming out on commercial DVD until 2011. Because of its long unavailability and the understandable jubilation attendant upon its rediscovery, it hasn’t been as uniformly or as harshly criticized as other early Katzman Columbias like Who’s Guilty, Son of the Guardsman, Hop Harrigan, and Chick Carter, Detective have been. However, it’s fully as listless as those disappointing efforts; though its cast is stronger overall than those of Guilty, Guardsman, or Harrigan, this strength is offset by Brenda’s more complete lack of action. Its closest relative is Chick Carter, with which (as we’ve seen) it shares many plotting similarities; like that chapterplay, it’s ultimately sunk by a thin, talky, uninteresting, and nearly action-free screenplay, despite a solid acting lineup of B-movie and serial veterans.

Chapter titles
 Hot News
 The Blazing Trap
 Taken for a Ride
 A Ghost Walks
 The Big Boss Speaks
 Man Hunt
 Hideout of Terror
 Killer at Large
 Dark Magic
 A Double-cross Backfires
 On the Spot
 Murder at Night
 The Mystery of the Payroll
Source:

See also
 List of American films of 1945
List of film serials by year
List of film serials by studio

References

External links
 
 

1945 films
American black-and-white films
1940s crime films
Columbia Pictures film serials
1940s English-language films
Films directed by Wallace Fox
Films about journalists
American crime films
Films with screenplays by George H. Plympton
Films based on comic strips
1940s American films